EMAYLA, also known as Emanuela Bellezza is an Italian-American singer, songwriter, guitarist and pianist, who gained popularity with her original music, after appearing on television networks MTV Très, Univision, RAI, Telefutura and TV Azteca. In 2012, she won a nationwide contest by MTV Très and was chosen by Colombian singer Juanes to sing a duet with him for inclusion on the Deluxe Edition of his album Juanes MTV Unplugged. Emayla won the contest by performing a cover of Juanes' song Fotografia. The album won a Grammy in 2013 as Best Latin Pop Album category. It also won two Latin Grammys: Album of The Year and Best Long Form Music Video. The video of their performance counts over a million and a half views on YouTube. As a result of these achievements, Emayla's song titled Ella Se Va was played in different main radios in Venezuela and reached the top 40 national music charts in the same country.

Early life
Emayla was born in San Remo, a small town in the Italian Riviera (North of Italy) and started taking music lessons when she was three years old. At age seven she took her first piano lesson, at age fifteen her first guitar lesson and at age eighteen her first vocal lesson. She began songwriting as a teenager, and aspired to a music career in Los Angeles.

At age sixteen she wrote her very first song, which was in English and it was called Fly Away. She studied foreign languages in high school and she graduated at the University La Sapienza of Rome in Foreign Languages and Modern Cultures. During the high school and university years, she kept writing songs and she continued her musical studies. At age eighteen, Bellezza joined her first band and started having live performance experience. She participated to various Italian music competitions and festivals with her original songs and she was one of the finalists at Castrocaro and Singing for Life music contest.

In 2007, at age twenty-three, Bellezza decided to move to Los Angeles, California where she attended Musicians Institute and graduated for the Vocal Program in 2009.

Career
 In 2009, Emayla song "Stay With Me" was nominated for Best R&B/Soul Song by The Hollywood Music In Media Awards  and she was featured on Music Connection magazine where she earned a recognition as Hottest Unsigned Artist of The Year.
 In August 2010, Emayla and her band were finalists at the competition called Battle Of The Bands, at the Hard Rock Cafe, in Las Vegas. She was also finalist as a songwriter and singer at the Italian contest called Demo D'Autore, that went live on Italian radio called Radio Rai, which is part of Italian main TV Station, RAI.
 She was a finalist in the 2011 John Lennon Songwriting Contest with her own song Esperanza de Amor.
 In 2012, besides performing with Juanes at the MTV Unplugged on MTV Tres, Emanuela also performed in duet with singer Franco De Vita at the Gibson Amphitheater and opened for Italian singer Jovanotti, at the El Rey Theatre, in Los Angeles.
 In 2013, Emayla released her album Ella Se Va, which was produced by multi-Grammy award winner Gustavo Borner.
 In 2013, her song "Lo Que Se Da Regresa" made her the finalist at the U.S.A. Songwriting Competition. On February 18 of that year, Emanuela appeared on Italian national television RAI and specifically on Rai Gulp, during the program "La TV Ribelle".
 In July 2014, Emayla songs, "Eres Tú" and "Emilia" were featured in a Season 2 episode of Hulu's series, East Los High.
 At the 2015 Rumi Awards in Las Vegas, Bellezza was the winner of "Best Artist - Europe" and "Best Singer - Duet".
 In 2016 Emayla worked with bass player Nathan East on the song "I Love To Dance", composed by the group "80's DNA Reloaded".
In 2019 Emayla released her album titled "New Freedom", written by herself and produced by Darryl Swann. and herself.

2007-09: Los Angeles and first single Strong 
Emayla's music career starts blooming when she moves to Los Angeles, in 2007. It is at Musicians Institute where she meets guitarist, music producer and videographer, Jean Luis Contreras, who did many collaborations with the artist, produced her songs, recorded her music videos and became the guitar player of her band.

They work together on her first single, called Strong, released in 2009. The music video was shot in Miami and was produced by Jean Luis Contreras and Pablo Pagan.

2009: Rain And Sunshine Of Heart 
Later in 2009, Emayla released her first EP, called Rain And Sunshine Of Heart.

The EP was produced by Troy Laureta (music producer and keyboard player of Ariana Grande, Jordan Pruitt, Jordin Sparks and brother of The Voice contestant Cheesa Laureta). The record includes all the R&B/Soul influences Bellezza had during her first 2 years living in The United States. Her single Stay With Me was nominated for the Hollywood Music And Media Awards as best song for the R&B/Soul category in 2009.

In the same year, Bellezza meets Beto Cuevas, ex-singer of the musical group La Ley. After listening to her CD, Beto describes Emanuela as "A glass of water in the middle of the desert, with the capability of immediately capturing the heart of the listener".

2010-11: Battle Of The Bands and the beginning of latin experience 
In August 2010, Emayla and her band were finalists at the competition called Battle Of The Bands, at the Hard Rock Cafe, in Las Vegas.

Perceiving the difference of cultures and traditions that Los Angeles embraces, in 2011 Emanuela feels the need of starting to write in Spanish, besides English and Italian. She started learning Spanish and writing her first songs in the new language generating the birth of a new album, called Matices De Amor.

2011: Matices De Amor and The John Lennon Songwriting Contest 
Matices De Amor, literally translated as Shades Of Love was entirely produced by Jean Luis Contreras and was released in late 2011.

The album, that contains ten songs (seven in Spanish, two in English and one in Italian) has all the Latin influences that Emayla absorbed during her Spanish immersion and experience and reflects Jean Luis' Latin origins (Venezuela). The title summarizes the meaning of the whole album which, with each song, describes all the different kinds all love. All the songs are based on Emanuela's life experience.

Emayla made different paintings, each of them representing a different song of the album. Almost all of the songs in the album have a painting that represent them.

Biggest part of the album talks about the romantic kind of love, while the very last one, A Song For My Father, is a song that Emanuela dedicated to her father, when he died. It is a nostalgic song and she sings about all the things she could not say to him, since when he unexpectedly and prematurely died in Italy she was already living in Los Angeles and never had a chance to say "goodbye".

One of the songs of that album, called Esperanza De Amor, was finalist at The John Lennon Songwriting Contest, for the Latin category

2012-13: MTV Unplugged with Juanes, performance with Franco De Vita and opening for Jovanotti 
In early 2012, Emayla won the contest created by MTV Très in 2012 called Unplug with Juanes, where she had the opportunity to perform in duet with Colombian multiple Grammy winner Juanes at his MTV Unplugged. Juanes himself hand-picked Emanuela as the winner of his contest and they performed the song Fotografia, originally sang in duet by Juanes and singer Nelly Furtado.

Emanuela performed with Juanes a second time in Los Angeles and this time at the Nokia Theater. In one of his interviews, Juanes defines Emanuela as "a super-star with a great talent and with an extraordinary voice".

In Summer 2012, Emanuela opened for Italian pop star Jovanotti at the El Rey Theater in Los Angeles.

Besides performing with Juanes, Emanuela also had the chance to perform in duet with Franco De Vita at the Gibson Amphitheater. The artists performed the song Tan Solo Tù, originally performed by Franco and Alejandra Guzman.

2013: Ella Se Va 
During the time Bellezza was in Miami for the Juanes MTV Unplugged, she met multiple Grammy winner and producer Gustavo Borner. Back in Los Angeles, after Unplugged, they started working together towards an EP, that was later called Ella Se Va.

The EP includes three songs written by Emayla herself and one song written by multiple Grammy winners Draco Rosa, George Noriega and Claudia Brant. It was recorded in Los Angeles and features the musicians Jimmy Johnson, Dean Parks, Aaron Sterling, Jon Gilutin and Jean Luis Contreras. The single Ella Se Va has been played on different radio stations in Venezuela, like La Romantica 88.9 and has been in the top 40 music charts in the same country.

The release of the EP was also featured on magazine People en Español, for the October edition.

Early that year, on February 18, Emanuela also made her appearance on RAI, the Italian national television channel, during the program "La TV Ribelle", on RAI Gulp.

Rumi Awards 2015 
Emayla took part and performed at Rumi Awards 2016 in Las Vegas, where she won two awards: "Best Artist Europe" and "Best Duet Singer".

2019: The new name "EMAYLA" and album release: "New Freedom" 
In June 2019, Emayla decides to change her name from her real name Emanuela Bellezza to Emayla.

On December 5, 2019, Emayla finally released her latest album, named "New Freedom", symbol of a new era of her life and reborn after a hard time of her life.

Present 
Emayla just released her 4th album, produced with notable music producer Darryl Swann.

She also keeps performing in the Los Angeles area.

Emayla was recently featured in a single called "I Love To Dance", where she collaborated with notable bassist Nathan East and other musicians. The single was written and produced by Ferdinando Mongelli in Sanremo, Italy.

Discography

Studio albums 
 2011 Matices De Amor
2019 New Freedom

EPs 
 2009 Rain And Sunshine Of Heart
 2013 Ella Se Va

Songs appearing in film and television 
 2009 Tu Estilo - Univision 34
 2011 Lanzate - Telefutura
 2012 Lanzate - Telefutura
 2013 Primer Impacto - Univision 34
 2014 East Los High - Episode #3
 2014 East Los High - Episode #8

Television appearances 
 2009 Tu Estilo - Univision 34
 2011 Lanzate - Telefutura
 2012 Lanzate - Telefutura
 2012 MTV Unplugged With Juanes - MTV Tres
 2013 News - CNN en Español
 2013 News - TV Azteca
 2013 Despierta America - Univision 34

Awards and nominations

YouTube recognition 
Because of her notability on YouTube, Emayla has been mentioned on Italian magazine Idea Web as "one of the most talented and beautiful musicians on YouTube".

Musical style and influences

Emayla describes her music as a fusion of pop and soul. She cites Aretha Franklin, Joss Stone, Jhené Aiko and Tracy Chapman as influences when she was younger. Some of her early stages' work has been compared to Laura Pausini.

References

External links
Official website
Youtube channel
Instagram page
Facebook page

1984 births
Italian pop singers
Italian women singer-songwriters
Italian singer-songwriters
Spanish-language singers of Italy
English-language singers from Italy
Italian expatriates in the United States
Living people
21st-century Italian singers
21st-century Italian women singers